Knibbs is a surname. Notable people with the surname include:

 Bill Knibbs (1942–2006), Canadian ice hockey player
 Darrel Knibbs (born 1949), Canadian ice hockey player
 George Handley Knibbs (1858–1929), Australian scientist and statistician
 J. W. Knibbs (1880–1953), American football player
 Ralph Knibbs (born 1964), English rugby player
 Thomas Knibbs, English footballer